Colin Cuthbert Gillies (8 October 1912 – 20 June 1996) was a New Zealand rugby union player. A first five-eighth, Gillies represented  and Otago at a provincial level, and was a member of the New Zealand national side, the All Blacks, in 1936. He played two matches for the All Blacks including one international against the touring Australian team.

References

1912 births
1996 deaths
Rugby union players from Oamaru
People educated at Waitaki Boys' High School
University of Otago alumni
New Zealand rugby union players
New Zealand international rugby union players
North Otago rugby union players
Otago rugby union players
Rugby union fly-halves